Long Hard Funky Dreams is the debut album by Scottish dance music singer Mary Kiani, released on 27 January 1997. All five singles from the album were hits on the UK Singles Chart, as well as on the Scottish Singles and UK Dance Singles charts, with lead single "When I Call Your Name" proving the most successful.

Track listing

A limited edition of the album was released with a second CD with mixes of the songs from the album, most of them previously available on the single releases' different formats. Some of these appear for the first time on CD. See below for track listing of the bonus CD.

References

1997 debut albums
Mary Kiani albums
Mercury Records albums